The 2010–11 Northern Illinois Huskies men's basketball team represented Northern Illinois University in the college basketball season of 2010–11. The team, led by head coached by Ricardo Patton, were members of the Mid-American Conference and played their homes game at the Convocation Center in DeKalb, Illinois.

Roster

Coaching staff

Schedule

|- align="center" bgcolor="#ffcccc"
| 1
| November 12
| Northwestern
| L 78–97
| Xavier Silas- 25
| Xavier Silas/ Nate Rucker- 6
| Michael Patton- 4
| Convocation Center, Dekalb, IL (4,001)
| 0–1 (0–0)
|- align="center" bgcolor="#ffcccc"
| 2
| November 12
| At Bradley
| L 63–66
| Xavier Silas- 22
| Nate Rucker- 10
| Michael Patton- 4
| Carver Arena, Peoria, IL (7,646)
| 0–2 (0–0)
|- align="center" bgcolor="#D8FFEB"
| 3
| November 21 
| Cardianl Stritch
| W 81–57
| Xavier Silas- 34
| Tim Toler/Lee Fisher- 7
| Bryan Hall- 5
| Convocation Center, Dekalb,IL (667)
| 1–2 (0–0)
|-- align="center" bgcolor="#D8FFEB"
| 4
| November 24
| At Maryland Eastern Shore
| W 86–80
| Xavier Silas- 34
| Xavier Silas/ Lee Fisher – 6
| Bryan Hall- 7
| Hytche Center, Princess Anne, MD (612)
| 2–2 (0–0)
|-align="center" bgcolor="#ffcccc"
| 5
| November 29
| Boise St
| L 80–52
| Bryan Hall- 10
| Tony Nixon- 5
| Bryan Hall/ Michael Patton- 3
| Convocation Center, Dekalb, Il (694)
| 2–3 (0–0)
|-

|-align="center" bgcolor="#ffcccc"
| 6
| December 2
| At Depaul
| L 86–84 
| Xavier Silas- 34
| Nate Rucker- 8
| Bryan Hall- 5
| Allstate Arena, Rosemont, IL (7,044)
| 2–4 (0–0)
|-align="center" bgcolor="#D8FFEB"
| 7
| December 14
|  Illinois-Chicago
| W 80–78
| Xavier Silas- 40 
| Lee Fisher- 9
| Xavier Silas- 3
| Convocation Center, Dekalb, IL (779)
| 3–4 (0–0)
|-lign="center" bgcolor="#ffcccc"
| 8
| December 18
|  At Temple
| L 84–74
| Xavier Silas- 27
| Cameron Madlock- 10
| Xavier Silas- 5
| Liacouras Center, Philadelphia, PA (3,116)
| 3–5 (0–0)
|- align="center" bgcolor="#ffcccc"
| 9
| December 22
|  At Southern Illinois
|  L 61–49
| Xavier Silas- 11
| Lee Fisher- 6
| Tim Toler- 4
| SIU Arena, Carbondale, IL (4,239)
| 3–6 (0–0)
|-  align="center" bgcolor="#ffcccc"
| 10
| December 27
|  At Missouri
|  L 97–69
|  Tim Toler- 13
|  Tim Toler/ Lee Fisher- 7
|  Michael Patton- 4
| Mizzou Arena, Columbia, MO (10,776)
| 3–7 (0–0)
|- align="center" bgcolor="#D8FFEB"
| 11
| December 31
|  Utah Valley
|   W 86–76 
|  Xavier Silas- 26
|  Tim Toler- 6
|  Tim Toler/ Xavier Silas- 3
| Convocation Center, Dekalb, IL (853)
| 4–7 (0–0)
|-

|-  align="center" bgcolor="#ffcccc"
| 12
| January 3
|  At Iowa State
|   L 72–63
|  Xavier Silas- 18
|  Tim Toler- 10 
|  Xavier Silas- 4
| Hilton Coliseum, Ames, IA (11,469)
| 4–8 (0–0)
|- align="center" bgcolor="#ffcccc"
| 13
| January 8
|  Ball State
|   L 75–70
|  Tim Toler- 22
|  Nate Rucker/ Jeremy Landers- 5
|  4 players with 3
| Convocation Center, Dekalb, IL (1,041)
| 4–9 (0–1)
|- align="center" bgcolor="#D8FFEB"
| 14
| January 11
|  Eastern Michigan
|   W 71–69
|  Xavier Silas- 31
|  Tim Toler – 7
|  Jeremy Landers- 7
| Convocation Center, Dekalb, IL (490)
| 5–9 (1–1)
|-
| 15
| January 15
|  Toledo
| 
| 
| 
| 
| Convocation Center, Dekalb, IL
|
|-
| 16
| January 20
|  At Central Michigan
| 
| 
| 
| 
| McGuirk Arena, Mount Pleasant, MI 
|
|-
| 17
| January 22
|  At Western Michigan
| 
| 
| 
| 
| University Arena, Kalamazoo, MI 
|
|-
| 18
| January 26
|  Akron
| 
| 
| 
| 
| Convocation Center, Dekalb, IL
|
|-
| 19
| January 29
|  At Buffalo
| 
| 
| 
| 
| Alumni Arena, Buffalo, NY 
|
|-

|-
| 20
| February 2
|   Bowling Green
| 
| 
| 
| 
| Convocation Center, Dekalb, IL 
|
|-
| 21
| February 5
|  At Ohio
| 
| 
| 
| 
| Convocation Center, Athens, OH 
|
|-
| 22
| February 9
|   At Miami (OH)
| 
| 
| 
| 
| Millett Hall, Oxford, OH 
|
|-
| 23
| February 12
|   Kent St)
| 
| 
| 
| 
| Convocation Center, Dekalb, IL
|
|-
| 24
| February 15
|   Western Michigan
| 
| 
| 
| 
| Convocation Center, Dekalb, IL
|
|-
| 25
| February 19
|   ESPNU BracketBusters, TBD
| 
| 
| 
| Convocation Center, Dekalb, IL
|
|-
| 26
| February 23
|   Central Michigan
| 
| 
| 
| 
| Convocation Center, Dekalb, IL
|
|-
| 27
| February 26
|   At Toledo
| 
| 
| 
| 
| Savage Arena, Toledo, OH
|

|-
| 28
| March 2
|   Eastern Michigan
| 
| 
| 
| 
| Convocation Center, Dekalb, IL 
|
|-
| 29
| March 5
|   At Ball State
| 
| 
| 
| 
| John E. Worthen Arena, Muncie, IN 
|
|}
|-
! colspan="2" | 2010–11 team schedule
|}

References

Northern Illinois Huskies men's basketball seasons
Northern Illinois Huskies
Northern Illinois Huskies men's basketball team
2010 in sports in Illinois